The Central District of Khorramshahr County is a district (bakhsh) in Khorramshahr County, Khuzestan Province, Iran. At the 2006 census, its population was 147,642, in 31,001 families.  The district has two cities: Khorramshahr and Moqavemat.  The district has three rural districts (dehestan): Gharb-e Karun Rural District, Howmeh-ye Gharbi Rural District, and Howmeh-ye Sharqi Rural District.

References 

Khorramshahr County
Districts of Khuzestan Province